Osman Nuri may refer to:

 Osman Nuri Eralp (1876–1940), Turkish veterinarian
 Osman Nuri Koptagel (1874–1942), officer of the Ottoman Army and general of the Turkish Army
 Osman Nuri Örek (1925–1999), Turkish Cypriot politician of the Turkish Republic of Northern Cyprus
 Osman Nuri Pasha (disambiguation), various people
 Osman Nuri Tekeli (1893–date of death unknown), Turkish bureaucrat
 Osman Nuri Topbaş (born 1942), Turkish Sufi leader and author

See also
 Osman (name)